Hedwig (minor planet designation: 476 Hedwig) (1901 GQ) is a main-belt asteroid discovered on August 17, 1901, by Luigi Carnera at Heidelberg. Named in honour of the wife of Swedish-Danish astronomer Elis Strömgren.

See also
 List of Solar System objects by size

References

External links 
 
 

Background asteroids
Hedwig
Hedwig
P-type asteroids (Tholen)
X-type asteroids (SMASS)
19010817